Year 941 (CMXLI) was a common year starting on Friday (link will display the full calendar) of the Julian calendar.

Events 
 By place 

 Byzantine Empire 
 May – September – Rus'–Byzantine War: The Rus' and their allies, the Pechenegs, under the Varangian prince Igor I of Kiev, cross the Black Sea with an invasion fleet of 1,000 ships (40,000 men) and disembark on the northern coast of Asia Minor. While the Byzantine fleet is engaged against the Arabs in the Mediterranean, the Rus' forces reach the gates of Constantinople. Emperor Romanos I organizes the defense of the capital and assembles 15 old ships (equipped with throwers of Greek fire) under the chamberlain (protovestiarios) Theophanes. The Byzantines repel the Rus' fleet (nearly annihilating the entire fleet) but can not prevent the invaders from pillaging the hinterland of Constantinople, venturing as far south as Nicomedia (modern-day İzmit). In September, John Kourkouas and Bardas Phokas ("the Elder"), two leading generals, destroy the Rus' forces in Thrace. Igor manages, with only a handful of boats, to escape to the Caspian Sea.

 Europe 
 Spring – Henry I, duke of Bavaria, plots to assassinate his brother, King Otto I, at the royal palace in Quedlinburg (modern Saxony-Anhalt), but the conspiracy is discovered and Henry is put in captivity in Ingelheim. He is released after doing penance at Christmas.
 Fall – Hugh of Provence, king of Italy, leads a fourth expedition to Rome to dislodge Alberic II. He proceeds to Lazio, preparing a campaign to capture the papal capital. Again the attacks fail and Hugh retreats to Milan.
 Olaf Guthfrithson, a Norse-Irish chieftain, is killed while raiding an ancient Anglian church at Tyninghame (Northern Northumbria). He is succeeded by his cousin Olaf Sigtryggsson as ruler of Jórvik (modern Yorkshire).

 Middle East 
 March 9 – The famed Green Dome of the Palace of the Golden Gate at Baghdad collapses, amidst heavy rainfall.

 By topic 
 Religion 
 Oda ("the Good") is appointed archbishop of Canterbury in England after the death of Wulfhelm.
 Kaminarimon, the eight-pillared gate to the Sensō-ji Buddhist temple in Tokyo, Japan, is erected.

Births 
 Brian Boru, High King of Ireland (approximate date) (d. 1014)
 Ibn Furak, Muslim imam, jurist and theologian (d. 1015)
 Lê Hoàn, emperor of the Early Lê Dynasty (Vietnam) (d.1005)
 Lothair III, king of the West Frankish Kingdom (d. 986)

Deaths 
 January 5 – Zhang Yanhan, Chinese chancellor (b. 884)
 February 12 – Wulfhelm, archbishop of Canterbury
 April 21 – Bajkam, Turkish military commander
 Abu Bakr Muhammad, Muslim governor
 Fujiwara no Sumitomo, Japanese nobleman
 Gurgen II, prince of Tao-Klarjeti (Georgia)
 Jayavarman IV, Angkorian king (Cambodia)
 Muhammad ibn Ya'qub al-Kulayni, Persian scholar (b. 864)
 Olaf Guthfrithson, Viking leader and king
 Órlaith íngen Cennétig, Irish queen
 Qian Yuanguan, king of Wuyue (b. 887)
 Rudaki ("Adam of Poets"), Persian poet (b. 858)
 Wang Dingbao, Chinese chancellor (b. 870)
 Zhao Sun, Chinese official and chancellor

References